Mas Darreh is a village in Deraz Kola Rural District, Babol Kenar District, Babol County, Mazandaran Province, Iran. At the 2006 census, its population was 15, in 4 families.

References 

Populated places in Babol County